STS-57 was a NASA Space Shuttle-Spacehab mission of  that launched 21 June 1993 from Kennedy Space Center, Florida.

Crew

Spacewalk 
  Low and Wisoff  – EVA 1
 EVA 1 Start: 25 June 1993
 EVA 1 End: 25 June 1993
 Duration: 5 hours, 50 minutes

Mission highlights 

The mission was launched on the summer solstice. During the course of the ten-day flight, the astronauts successfully conducted scores of biomedical and materials sciences experiments inside the pressurized SPACEHAB module. Two astronauts participated in a spacewalk (EVA) and European Retrievable Carrier (EURECA) was retrieved by the crew and stowed inside Endeavours payload bay. EURECA had been deployed from the Space Shuttle Atlantis in August 1992 (STS-46) and contained several experiments to study the long-term effects of exposure to microgravity.

An improperly installed electrical connector on Endeavours Remote Manipulator System (Canadarm), installed 180° off its correct position, prevented EURECA from recharging its batteries with orbiter power. A flight rule requiring antenna stowage was waived and EURECA was lowered into the payload bay without latching its antenna. Mission specialists David Low and Peter Wisoff safely secured EURECA's dual antennas against the science satellite during the spacewalk. David Low was mounted on a foot restraint on the end of Endeavours robotic arm while Mission specialist Nancy J. Currie-Gregg positioned the arm so David Low could gently push the arms against EURECA's latch mechanisms. Payload controllers then drove the latches to secure each antenna. The five-hour, fifty-minute spacewalk completed STS-57 mission's primary goal of retrieving the EURECA science satellite. Afterwards, Low and Wisoff completed maneuvers for an abbreviated extravehicular activity (EVA) Detailed Test Objective (DTO) using the robot arm. Activities associated with each of the areas of investigation — mass handling, mass fine alignment and high torque — were completed with both EVA crewmen taking turns on the robot arm. Low and Wisoff wrapped up their spacewalk and returned to Endeavour's airlock shortly before 3:00 p.m. CDT.

During the rest of the mission, the crew worked on experiments in the Spacehab module in the Shuttle's lower deck. These experiments included studying body posture, the spacecraft environment, crystal growth, metal alloys, wastewater recycling and the behavior of fluids. Among the experiments was an evaluation of maintenance equipment that may be used on Space Station Freedom. The diagnostic equipment portion of the Tools and Diagnostics System experiment was performed by Nancy J. Currie-Gregg. Using electronics test instruments including an oscilloscope and electrical test meter, Currie-Gregg conducted tests on a mock printed circuit board and communicated with ground controllers via computer messages on suggested repair procedures and their results.

On 22 June 1993, all six crew members talked with President Clinton.

In addition, Brian Duffy and Jeff Wisoff ran experiments in transferring fluids in weightlessness without creating bubbles in the fluid. The experiment, called the Fluid Acquisition and Resupply Experiment (FARE), studied filters and processes that could improve methods of refueling spacecraft in orbit. By transferring water between -diameter transparent tanks on Endeavours middeck, engineers evaluated how the fluids behaved while the shuttle's steering jets fired for small maneuvers. Janice Voss worked on the Liquid Encapsulated Melt Zone (LEMZ) experiment, which used a process called 
floating zone crystal growth. The low-gravity conditions of space flight permit large crystals to be grown in space.

Ron Grabe, Brian Duffy and Janice Voss participated in the Neutral Body Position study. Flight surgeons had noted on previous flights that the body's basic posture changes while in microgravity. To better document this phenomenon over the duration of a space mission, still and video photography of crew members in a relaxed position were taken early and late in the mission. Researchers included these findings in the design specifications of future spacecraft to make work stations and living areas more efficient and comfortable for astronauts.

Currie-Gregg conducted the electronics procedures portion of the Human Factors Assessment. She set up a work platform, then hooked up a notebook computer and went through a simulated computer procedure for a space station propulsion system.

On 28 June 1993, Currie-Gregg performed an impromptu plumbing job on the Environmental Control Systems Flight Experiment, a study of wastewater purification equipment that may be used aboard future spacecraft. The EFE used a solution of water and potassium iodide to simulate wastewater, which was then pumped through a series of filters to purify it. During the flight, experimenters observed a reduced flow of water through the device and opted to perform maintenance. Currie-Gregg loosened a fitting on one water line inside the experiment, wrapped the loose fitting with an absorbent diaper, and, using a laptop computer on board, reversed a pump on the experiment for about 20 minutes in an attempt to flush out the clog. She then retightened the fitting and resumed normal operation of the experiment. Ground experimenters proceeded to monitor the EFE for about an hour and a half to ensure the clog had been cleared.

Mission insignia 
The five stars and shape of the robotic arm of the insignia symbolize the flight's numerical designation in the Space Transportation System's mission sequence. The SpaceHab overall contours are represented as the inner red lining of the patch. Also visible is the EURECA, with 3 yellow contrails, that are representative of the astronaut insignia (EURECA replacing the traditional star atop), with the orbiter circling the Earth.

See also 

 List of human spaceflights
 List of Space Shuttle missions
 Outline of space science
 Space Shuttle

References

External links 
 NASA mission summary 
 STS-57 Video Highlights 

Space Shuttle missions
Spacecraft launched in 1993